Higher Blackley is an electoral district or ward in the north of the City of Manchester, England. The population of this ward at the 2011 census was 11,688.

Heaton Park, one of Europe's largest parks, is in this ward.

A  new "education village"  has been constructed in Higher Blackley, including a "learning resource centre" containing a library and IT facilities with specialist facilities including Science, Humanities and English. The project was occupied in stages, with Our Lady's RC High School and North Ridge SEN occupying the building by January 2009, followed by Meade Hill ESBD in July 2009.

In 2014, a report from Open Society Foundations described the Higher Blackley ward as " a strong and often supportive community with a sense of identity and belonging based on solid social bonds and connections ... a community that had significant pockets of deprivation alongside areas of relative affluence, a majority white working-class community which has undergone social change including increased migration into the area, and a history of far-right political activity".

Governance 
Higher Blackley is in the parliamentary constituency of Blackley and Broughton. Currently all three councillors: Paula Sadler, Shelley Lanchbury and John Farrell are members of the Labour Party.

 indicates seat up for re-election.  indicates seat won in by-election.

References

External links 
Manchester City Council
St Andrew's Church
Heaton Park at Manchester City Council's site

Manchester City Council Wards